Blandford Forest is a scattered area of woodland centred to the northwest of the town of Blandford Forum in North Dorset, England.

Location 
According to the Forestry Commission, Blandford Forest comprises a number of scattered woodlands around the village of Winterborne Stickland, including Whatcombe Wood and France Down.

History 
The Forest has one scheduled archaeological site: the ancient earthwork of Crossdyke on Okeford Hill near Shillingstone.

References 

Forests and woodlands of Dorset